The men's 1500 metres event at the 1994 Commonwealth Games was held on 26, 27 and 28 August at the Centennial Stadium in Victoria, British Columbia.

Medalists

Results

Heats

Semifinals

Final

References

1500
1994